52nd Street Themes is a studio album by the American jazz saxophonist Joe Lovano. It was recorded in early November 1999 and released by the Blue Note label on April 25, 2000. The album won the Grammy Award for Best Large Jazz Ensemble Album. It is named after the jazz standard by Thelonious Monk.

Background
To record the album, Lovano has assembled a medium-sized band of prominent musicians, inviting trumpeter Tim Hagans, trombonist Conrad Herwig, alto saxophonist Steve Slagle, baritonist Gary Smulyan, pianist John Hicks, bassist Dennis Irwin, drummer Lewis Nash, and tenor saxophonists George Garzone and Ralph Lalama. The record also features Cleveland-based jazz composers and arrangers Tadd Dameron and Willie Smith. Lovano initially met them through his father, Tony Lovano, who was also a saxophonist collaborating with both of them. Later, Lovano and Smith played saxophone together in Jack McDuff's band—for which Smith wrote. On 52nd Street Themes Lovano plays only tenor sax.

Reception
Doug Ramsey of Jazz Times stated:

David Adler of All About Jazz commented:

Track listing

Personnel
 Steve Slagle – alto saxophone
 Joe Lovano – tenor saxophone
 George Garzone – tenor saxophone
 Ralph Lalama – tenor saxophone
 Gary Smulyan – baritone saxophone
 Tim Hagans – trumpet
 Conrad Herwig – trombone
 John Hicks – piano
 Dennis Irwin – bass
 Lewis Nash – drums

References

External links
 

Blue Note Records albums
Joe Lovano albums
2000 albums
Grammy Award for Best Large Jazz Ensemble Album